Highway 39 is a provincial, paved, highway located in the southern portion of the Canadian province of Saskatchewan connecting North Portal and Moose Jaw in the north. This is a primary Saskatchewan highway maintained by the provincial and national governments and providing a major trucking and tourism route between the United States via Portal, Burke County, North Dakota, and North Portal, Saskatchewan. On July 3, 2000, Highways and Transportation Minister Maynard Sonntag officiated at the ribbon cutting ceremony opening the new duty-free shop and the twinned highway at Saskatchewan's busiest border crossing. Highway 39 is one of Canada's busiest highways, facilitating transport for $6 billion in trade goods via approximately 100,000 trucks over the year. The entire length of highway 39 is paved. The CanAm Highway comprises Saskatchewan Highways Hwy 35, Hwy 39, Hwy 6, Hwy 3, as well as Hwy 2.   of Saskatchewan Highway 39 contribute to the CanAm Highway between Weyburn and Corinne. The junction of Hwy 39 with the Trans–Canada divided four-lane highway is done via a "Parclo" or partial cloverleaf interchange.

Travel route 

Starting in the south-east is North Portal or the Port of North Portal customs which is the province's only duty-free shop. Coalfields No. 4 rural municipality is dependent upon its grazing lands, oil wells and coal mining. The land on either side of the Souris River is too stony for agricultural purposes. The little hamlet of Pinto comprises post office and rail siding. Roche Percée, an unorganized area is named after a geophysical feature of the area. Short Creek Cairn is near the Roche Percee turn off from Highway 39. Located just off of Sk Hwy 39, are two arches created by limestone rocks upon which historic animals, and initials are carved. The local first nation found this site to be a power centre. This Short Creek Cairn is also a resting place for the North-West Mounted Police in 1874 on the Great March West. Although the underground coal mines which lined the Souris River valley have closed, there are two large dragline surface coal mines still operating supplementing agricultural income for residents of Bienfait and Roche Percée. 

Estevan, the power centre and eighth largest city of Saskatchewan offers tours of the Rafferty Dam, Boundary Dam Power Station, Boundary Dam Mine, the Shand Power Station, and Shand Greenhouse. The city of Estevan is nicknamed Saskatchewan's Energy Capital, as it is provided with coal, natural gas, and oil resources. Prairie Mines & Royalty Ltd. (PMRL) operates the two large coal mines, The Boundary Dam Mine and Bienfait Mine supplying 6.1 million cubic tons of coal to the Shand Power Station and Boundary Dam Power Station. Estevan Heritage Walking Tour and the Historic Driving Tour through the Souris Valley brochures are both available at the Saskatchewan Visitor Information booth. Woodlawn Regional Park features the Souris Valley Theatre which puts on live plays.

Weyburn, the opportunity city, has also been dubbed the Soo Line City due its connection with Chicago on the Soo Line of the Canadian Pacific Railway CPR. The city of 9,433 people is situated on Sk Hwy 35, Sk Hwy 39, and Sk Hwy 13. The small towns of Exon and Converge have been absorbed into the city of Weyburn today. The Pasqua branch or the Souris, Arcola, Weyburn, Regina CPR branch, Portal Section CPR on the Soo Line, Moose Jaw, Weyburn, Shaunavon, Lethbridge section CPR, The Brandon, Marfield, Carlyle, Lampman, Radville, Willow Bunch sectionCNR, and the Regina, Weyburn, Radville, Estevan, Northgate section CNR have all run through Weyburn. Weyburn is located astride the Williston geological Basin which contains oil deposits, and several wells operate in the vicinity. Weyburn features roadside attractions of a large Lighthouse Water Tower, Wheat sheaves and Prairie Lily. The Souris River continues south-east through North Dakota eventually meeting the Assiniboine River in Manitoba. In the 19th century this area was known as an extension of the Greater Yellow Grass Marsh. "Extensive flood control programs have created reservoirs, parks and waterfowl centres along the Souris River." Between 1988 and 1995, the Rafferty-Alameda Project was constructed to alleviate spring flooding problems created by the Souris River.

Rouleau was the host town for the popular Canadian sitcom, Corner Gas, which aired from 2004 - 2009. The show was set in the fictional town of Dog River, Saskatchewan.

Near the northern terminus is Moose Jaw, also called "Little Chicago". Moose Jaw, is a city of 32,132 at the Sk Hwy 1 Trans–Canada and Sk Hwy 2 intersection. Capone's Car, Moose Family and Mac the Moose are all large roadside attractions of Moose Jaw. Moose Jaw Trolley Company (1912) is still an operating electric cable trolleys offering tours of Moose Jaw. Temple Gardens Mineral Spa Resort, Tunnels of Moose Jaw, and History of Transportation Western Development Museum. are major sites of interest of this city.  The juncture of Moose Jaw and Thunder Creek produced the best source of water for steam engines, and Moose Jaw became the CPR divisional point.  AgPro Inland Grain Terminal operated by Saskatchewan Wheat Pool.  These large capacity concrete grain terminals are replacing the smaller grain elevators which were numerous along the highway, sentinels of most communities along the route. Improved technology for harvest, transport and road construction have made the large inland terminals more viable economically. The rural governing body around Moose Jaw is Moose Jaw No 161 which serves 1,228 residents (2006 census) which includes the Moose Jaw, Canadian Forces Base. Meat-processing plants, salt, potash, urea fertilizer, anhydrous ammonia and ethanol producers abound in this area with easy transport access to the Trans–Canada Highway.

History
The railways would not build across the western frontier without settlement as it would be too costly to provide train service across a barren wilderness. The Clifford Sifton immigration policy encourages settlers to arrive. Western settlement began and immigration encroached across the Manitoba and United States borders into the North-West Territories which later became Saskatchewan. Immigration settlement to the last best west and the early highways began in the south-east. The Federal Government survey crew reached this south-eastern area of the District of Assiniboia, North-West Territories in 1880. In 1881, the province of Manitoba expanded to its present boundaries and land could be purchased for $10.00 an acre. President Lincoln's U.S. Homestead Act was passed in 1862 and lands there were taken. In 1872, Canada passed the Dominion Lands Act attracting homesteaders to the West.

Saskatchewan Provincial Highway 39 paralleled the headwaters of the Souris River as well as the Canadian Pacific Railway (CPR) along the south-eastern portion of its route. The highway traverses a course on a diagonal from south-east to north-west. The road followed the early surveyed road allowances made by the Provincial Highway 39, the precursor of the Saskatchewan Highway 39 followed the surveyed grade of the CPR or Soo Line between the United States border and east of Moose Jaw. Travel along Provincial Highway 39 before the 1940s would have been travelling on the square following the township road allowances, barbed wire fencing, and rail lines. As the surveyed township roads were the easiest to travel, the first highway was designed on 90 degree right angle corners as the distance traversed the prairie along range roads and township roads.

With the establishment of settlements and population came the attendant need for education, health, fire, and police protection and an urgent need to improve methods of travel. The North-West Territories established Departments which did not last long, and were soon replaced by a rural administrative system called Local Improvement Districts (LID). Local Improvement Districts were very large, and with the early dirt trails for roads, and a limited number of automobiles, the area was found much to large to administer. The LID soon gave way to the rural municipality system of rural civic administration and encompassed on average 9 townships, 3x3 in area, which were each  square, and with some modifications is still the rural administration in use today. A rural municipality (R.M.) was an elected governing system providing essential services such as police, fire, health, education and infrastructure services for rural residents. For example, LID 64 was the precursor of Brock No. 64 in the district of Assiniboia, North-West Territories. Historically, community residents could pay taxes or supply a couple days per quarter section labour constructing roads, bridges, and fireguards instead of paying taxes. This civic government with its elected officials attended to the maintenance and construction of the early pioneer road. Two horse then eight horse scrapers maintained these early dirt roads.

"The final meeting of the joint LIDs was held on November 5, 1910. By now taxes were up to $8.00 per quarter section. During the last few years of the LID Government a few changes began to take place. The road work day was reduced from ten to eight hours. The first grader was bought on March 31, 1906. Further road machinery was purchased, drag scrapers at $7,25 each and wheel scrapers at $51.00 each. Road overseers were also weed inspectors. In 1908, each Township received $100.00 for road work. Farmers were paid $30.00 an acre for land used for road building....
Road appropriations for 1927 were $2,500.00 for each Division with a tax rate of 6 mills... In 1928, the R. M.[Rural Municipality of Estevan No. 5] purchased a Holt 60 Caterpillar tractor and a 12-foot grader for $9,200.00. Road building now cost $103.00 a mile. The next year an elevating grader was purchased for $2,425.00. In 1930... Construction began on Highway 39."-A Tale That is Told: Estevan 1890 - 1980.

By 1940 Hwy 39 is shown on maps as travelling on the diagonal and straightened, no longer is the road depicted on the square.  However, a close up of a 1955 map, shows still a right angle segment of the highway near Corinne as well as the highway south of Estevan to North Portal.

In 1947 and 1948, the highway was paved from North Portal to its junction with Hwy 6 at Corinne. However, the paved surface fell into disrepair within a few years; a Leader-Post reporter wrote in 1953 that "practically the entire road, from North Portal through to Corinne is just a mass of large gaping potholes, ruts, and cracks, and in some places the hard surface is gone completely." Saskatchewan Motor Transport association director A.R. Mang blamed the poor condition of the road on a failure to place a suitable "base course", a layer of gravel and clay, between the pavement and the road's earthen base. A 1955 map shows that a segment between Estevan and Lang had reverted to gravel and a 1956 highway map shows the entire segment between Weyburn and Estevan as a gravel highway.  These maps also show the segment between Corinne and the junction with the Trans Canada Highway as gravel. Repairs were carried out at considerable expense, but the situation required temporary bans on heavy traffic and the rerouting of traffic along nearby roads.

Highways and Transportation Minister Maynard Sonntag announced a highway resurfacing for Hwy 39 for the summer of 2001.  Highways and Transportation Minister Mark Wartman announced a highway resurfacing for Highway 39 in 2003. Prime Minister Chrétien and Premier Calvert announced a highway improvement to be completed for Highway 39 by the year 2007. This highway improvement saw the highway twinned at North Portal for easy access to the new duty-free shop.  A trade group called the Soo Line Corridor Association advocates twinning much of Hwy 39 and part of Hwy 6 to create a continuous twinned corridor stretching from Regina to North Portal to boost Saskatchewan's trade with the United States.  Premier Calvert had expressed interest in the proposal but no action has been taken to implement it.

CanAm Highway
The  segment between Weyburn and Corinne is designated as a portion of the CanAm Highway. Near Corinne, Hwy 39 is concurrent with Hwy 6, at Corinne, the CanAm Highway continues north on Hwy 6. South of Weyburn the CanAm Highway crosses the Canada–United States border via Hwy 35.
"The projects on Highways 39 and 6 will help to improve traffic flow through these Canada/U.S. ports. 'Highways 6 and 39 are very important to Saskatchewan – serving as tourism links and major north-south trade corridors to the U.S.,' Sonntag said."

Major intersections
From south to north.

Highway 39A

Highway 39A is a highway in the Canadian province of Saskatchewan serving the city of Estevan. It runs from the Highway 18 / Highway 39 concurrency east of Estevan to Highway 39, northwest of the city. It is the original configuration for Highway 39 through Estevan and was designated after the Estevan Bypass was opened in 2015.

The highway runs concurrently with Highway 18 from it southern terminus east of Estevan along 4th Street, to Souris Avenue where Highway 18 turns south and leaves the concurrency, becoming concurrent with Highway 47. It continues to 13th Avenue where Highway 47 turns north and Highway 39A continues northwest, leaving Estevan to its northern terminus with Highway 39.

Major intersections

References

External links 

 A document from Saskatchewan Highways and Transportation: Winter Highway Conditions
 Big Things of Canada, A Celebration of Community Monuments of Canada
 Fading Town of Pasqua, Saskatchewan
 Saskatchewan Highways Website—Highway Numbering
Ralph, Saskatchewan
 Saskatchewan Road Map Travel Guide:  #39 Canada / United States Border To City of Moose Jaw
United States / Canada Border -  Saskatchewan Canada Welcome to Saskatchewan, Canada - For continuation of highway travel north via Saskatchewan highway # 39 , see MilebyMile.com Saskatchewan Highway # 39 U.S. / Canada border to Moose Jaw Saskatchewan, for driving directions.  - Start/finish of highway travel log.- Se Pick up the trail of America's greatest legends in North Dakota, and you'll find yourself in a legendary adventure of your own. Lewis and Clark, Sakakawea, George Custer, Sitting Bull and Theodore Roosevelt lived out larger-than-life adventures here. Whether you follow in their footsteps and rediscover the past or blaze your own trail and discover what makes North Dakota legendary today, you'll find wide-open spaces and wide-open fun!
View from highway. Services at highway. Border crossing access. Pick up the trail of America's greatest legends in North Dakota, and you'll find yourself in a legendary adventure of your own. Lewis and Clark, Sakakawea, George Custer, Sitting Bull and Theodore Roosevelt lived out larger-than-life adventures here. Whether you follow in their footsteps and rediscover the past or blaze your own trail and discover what makes North Dakota legendary today, you'll find wide-open spaces and wide-open fun!

039
Transport in Estevan
Transport in Moose Jaw
Weyburn